The Americas Zone was one of the three zones of the regional Davis Cup competition in 2000.

In the Americas Zone there were four different tiers, called groups, in which teams competed against each other to advance to the upper tier. Winners in Group I advanced to the World Group Qualifying Round, along with losing teams from the World Group first round. Teams who lost their respective ties competed in the relegation play-offs, with winning teams remaining in Group I, whereas teams who lost their play-offs were relegated to the Americas Zone Group II in 2001.

The second round tie between Chile and Argentina was marred by crowd trouble which resulted in the Argentinian team withdrawing from the tie. Chile were declared the winners of the tie by the Davis Cup Committee, however subsequent rulings resulted in Chile being prevented progressing to the Qualifying Round; additionally both teams received fines and Chile were barred from hosting home ties until 2002.

Participating nations

Draw

 relegated to Group II in 2001.
 and  advance to World Group Qualifying Round.

First round

Chile vs. Canada

Peru vs. Bahamas

Colombia vs. Ecuador

Second round

Chile vs. Argentina

Peru vs. Ecuador

First round play-offs

Canada vs. Argentina

Bahamas vs. Colombia

Second round play-offs

Colombia vs. Argentina

References

External links
Davis Cup official website

Davis Cup Americas Zone
Americas Zone Group I